Joaquín Almunia Amann (born 17 June 1948) is a Spanish politician and formerly, prominent member of the European Commission. During his tenure in the two Barroso Commissions, he was European commissioner responsible for economic and monetary affairs (2004–2009) and, subsequently, vice-president and the European Commissioner for Competition (2009–2014). Previously, he had been Spanish Minister for Employment (1982–1986) and Public Administrations (1986–1991). From 1997 to 2000, he was the leader of the opposition as secretary general of the Spanish Socialist Workers' Party, standing in and losing the 2000 Spanish general election against the then incumbent Spanish prime minister, José María Aznar.

Early life and education
Born in Bilbao on 17 June 1948 to a bourgeois family, son to an engineer (father) of Valencian origin and a cultivated mother daughter of a German physician of Jewish ancestry. His grandfather Isaac Amann was one of the promoters of the Bilbao–Getxo railway. Almunia attended the Jesuit School of Indautxu in Bilbao. He graduated with degrees in economics and law in 1971 and 1972, respectively, from the also Jesuit University of Deusto in Bilbao, and completed follow-up studies at the École pratique des hautes études in Paris, from 1970 to 1971. He also completed a program at the Harvard Kennedy School at Harvard University for senior managers in government in 1991. He was an associate lecturer on employment and social security law at the University of Alcalá de Henares from 1991 to 1994.

Career

Parliamentary and government posts 

Almunia was chief economist of the Unión General de Trabajadores (UGT), a trade union linked to the Spanish Socialist Workers' Party (PSOE), from 1976 to 1979. He was economist at the Council Bureau of the Spanish Chambers of Commerce in Brussels from 1972 to 1975.

Almunia was a member of the Congress of Deputies from 1979 to 2004, representing Madrid. He served as Minister of Employment and Social Security of the Government of Spain from 1982 to 1986 and as Minister of Public Administration from 1986 to 1991. He was replaced by Juan Manuel Eguiagaray in the latter post. He was also the PSOE spokesperson from 1994 to 1997.

Socialist party leader 
Upon the resignation of Felipe González after being defeated in the 1996 elections, the PSOE Convention (Congreso federal) appointed Almunia as the party leader (Secretary-General), a position he held from 1997 to 2000.

In 1998, fellow party member and former minister Josep Borrell decided to run against Almunia, in the first national primary election ever held in the PSOE since the Second Republic, intended to determine who the party would nominate as its prime ministerial candidate vis-à-vis the 2000 general election. Borrell ran as the underdog, campaigning as the candidate of the socialist base against the party establishment, which largely supported Almunia, including former Prime Minister González. Unexpectedly, Borrell won the primary election, commanding 114,254 of the member's votes (54.99%), versus the 92,860 (44.67%) obtained by Almunia. Thus began an uneasy relationship and power-sharing —the "bicefalia" (duumvirate)— between the official party leader, Almunia, and the prime ministerial candidate elected by the members in the primaries, Borrell. However, in May 1999, a fraud investigation affecting two former officials appointed by Borrell several years earlier while he was at the Ministry of Finance, led to his resignation as Prime Ministerial candidate.

In 2000, Almunia was therefore the PSOE candidate for prime minister. The party was again defeated by incumbent Prime Minister José María Aznar of the conservative PP, suffering its worst result in a general election since the Spanish transition to democracy, which resulted in an absolute majority for Aznar. As a result, Almunia resigned as PSOE leader.

Almunia was the director of the research program on "equality and redistribution of income" at the Fundación Argentaria from 1991 to 1994. In 2002 he founded and served as director of a progressive think tank called Laboratorio de Alternativas (Fundación Alternativas).

European Commissioner 

He first joined the Prodi Commission on 26 April 2004 as a successor to Pedro Solbes (who had resigned to join the new Zapatero government) and was reappointed by Barroso in November 2004.

As EU Commissioner for Competition, Almunia was responsible for initiating in 2014 investigations under State aid (European Union) rules into the tax planning practices of Apple, Starbucks and Fiat, as well as Amazon.

He is an Honorary Fellow of St Edmund's College, Cambridge.

Other activities

International organizations
 European Bank for Reconstruction and Development (EBRD), Ex-Officio Member of the Board of Governors (2004–2010)

Non-profit organizations
 Aristide Merloni Foundation, Member of the Scientific Council (since 2019)
 The European House – Ambrosetti, Member of the Scientific Committee for 'Building the Energy Union to Fuel European Growth' (2015)
 Centre for European Policy Studies (CEPS), Chairman
 Centre for European Reform, Member of the Advisory Board
 European Council on Foreign Relations (ECFR), Member
 European Policy Centre (EPC), Member of the Strategic Council
 Friends of Europe, Member of the Board of Trustees
 Jacques Delors Institute, Member of the Board of Directors

References

External links 
 
 Joaquín Almunia, Official Media Gallery

|-

|-

|-

|-

|-

|-

1948 births
European Commissioners for Competition
Harvard Kennedy School alumni
Leaders of political parties in Spain
Living people
Members of the 1st Congress of Deputies (Spain)
Members of the 2nd Congress of Deputies (Spain)
Members of the 3rd Congress of Deputies (Spain)
Members of the 4th Congress of Deputies (Spain)
Members of the 5th Congress of Deputies (Spain)
Members of the 6th Congress of Deputies (Spain)
Members of the 7th Congress of Deputies (Spain)
Members of the 8th Congress of Deputies (Spain)
Politicians from Bilbao
Recipients of the Order of the Cross of Terra Mariana, 2nd Class
Spanish European Commissioners
Spanish Socialist Workers' Party politicians
University of Deusto alumni
University of Paris alumni
Spanish expatriates in France